Layousse Diallo (born 10 January 1997) is a Senegalese footballer.

Club career
After not playing in the 2018–19 season, on 13 August 2019 he returned to Bisceglie.

References

1997 births
Living people
Senegalese footballers
Association football defenders
U.S. Avellino 1912 players
Casertana F.C. players
A.S. Bisceglie Calcio 1913 players
Serie B players
Serie C players
Senegalese expatriate footballers
Expatriate footballers in Italy